George Evelyn (born 15 January 1970), better known by his stage name Nightmares on Wax or DJ E.A.S.E., is an English DJ and record producer from Leeds. His music has been released by Warp Records. He is based in Ibiza. Nightmares on Wax were originally a group consisting of Evelyn and John Halnon, and then later with Kevin Harper.

Early life
George Evelyn was born in Leeds. His father and sister introduced him to the soul music of Quincy Jones and Curtis Mayfield. Later, he was fascinated by the hip hop tracks such as "Rapper's Delight" and "Buffalo Gals".

Career
Nightmares on Wax was originally formed in 1988 by George Evelyn as a group project with John Halnon, and later with Kevin Harper. Their debut studio album, A Word of Science: The First and Final Chapter, was released on Warp in 1991. After the release of the album, Harper left the group to pursue a career in DJing. Robin Taylor-Firth became a frequent collaborator with Evelyn.

The second studio album for Warp, titled Smokers Delight, was released in 1995. It was placed at number 15 on Facts "50 Best Trip-Hop Albums of All Time" list. Evelyn released Carboot Soul in 1999, and Mind Elevation in 2002. In 2005, Evelyn started his own record label Wax On.

He released In a Space Outta Sound in 2006, Thought So in 2008, Feelin' Good in 2013,  Shape the Future in 2018, and Shout Out! To Freedom... (2021)

Discography

Studio albums
 A Word of Science: The First and Final Chapter (1991)
 Smokers Delight (1995)
 Carboot Soul (1999)
 Mind Elevation (2002)
 In a Space Outta Sound (2006)
 Thought So (2008)
 Feelin' Good (2013)
 Shape the Future (2018)
 Shout Out! To Freedom... (2021)

Compilation albums
 Now Is the Time (2014)

DJ mixes
 DJ-Kicks: Nightmares on Wax (2000)
 Late Night Tales: Nightmares on Wax (2003)
 Coming Home (2009)
 Wax Da Beach (2011)
 Back To Mine (2019)

EPs
 A Case of Funk (1991)
 Still Smokin... (1996)
 Sound of N.O.W. (2000)
 Ground Floor (2016)

Singles
 "Dextrous" (1989)
 "Aftermath #1" (1990)
 "Set Me Free" (1992)
 "Happiness!" (1992)
 "Alive" (1994)
 "DreddOverBoard" (1996)
 "Finer" (1999)
 "Les Nuits" (1999)
 "Keep On" (2000)
 "Know My Name" (2002)
 "70s 80s" (2003)
 "Date with Destiny" (2003)
 "Brothers on the Slide (Dub)" (2003)
 "Flip Ya Lid" (2006)
 "The Sweetest" (2006)
 "195lbs" (2008)
 "Citizen Cane" (2017)
 "Back to Nature" (2017)

References

Further reading

External links

 
 
 Nightmares on Wax at Warp

 

Living people
1970 births
DJs from Leeds
English record producers
British trip hop musicians
Black British musicians
Remixers
Warp (record label) artists
Rhythm King artists
Electronic dance music DJs